The Non-Manufacturing Business Activity Index is a seasonally adjusted index released by the Institute for Supply Management measuring business activity and conditions in the United States service economy as part of the Non-Manufacturing ISM Report on Business. The index is composed of 4 sub-indicators, each of which have a 25% weight: business activity, new orders, employment and supplier deliveries.

An index greater than 50 indicates growth in business activity.

Recent history

References

External links 
 Non-manufacturing ISM Report on Business

Business indices